St. Helena is a Catholic church in Karşıyaka, Turkey. It was built in 1904 by Raymond Charles Péré.

History 
St. Helena Catholic Church designed by Raymand Charles Péré who is an architect of Clock Tower in Konak on the plot that was given to Catholic Community late in 20th century. This Catholic Community was associated with the monk Don Alsonfo Vallery.

The construction of church completed by Kont Nikolai Alliotti who provide financial support and by Padishah 2nd Abdülhamit who gave the permission to built it, in 1904. Also according to rumor, the church was supported by Muslim Community at the time that church was the under development. This case shows that, at that time the religious fellowships had most important whereness. Nowadays, St Helen Catholic Church is used operatively. 
(In the step of entitling, there were many proposals but looking at the period in political condition, church entitled “ St Helena” which was the innocuous name, also, name of Roman Emperor Constantius Chloros’s wife and mother of the 1st Constantins. Many people believed that real cross and relics are founded and protected by St Helena.

The construction, which was built-in brick, concrete and sandstone.

The claims incurred of structure caused to renovate the interior in 1968 and great efforts have been made to protect the historical texture. Although, there was renewal of the interior, the exterior has not been restored. The method means that the brick arches covered with concrete. Using column was avoided in the main axis of the interior of church, which had cross form use as a classical church design.

Context 

St Helena are in harmony with the many residential building surrounding the church which is located at the center of Karşıyaka. Also, the structure is not for away in distance (near to) Karşıyaka Çarşı (Bazaar) thus, the transportation to Catholic Church is quite easy.
The structure still keeps the splendor of the first day despite developing environment. Church is isolated from the outside with the help of its garden, which is surrounded by high-rise building. Also, church and its garden are protected with high walls and magnificent garden doors that are on a straight line with the entrance go church. In this case, the church has an axial approach.

Formal Qualities 

Formal Qualities:

There is big gallery between small galleries, which are located on both sides of church. This situation shows that the church sits on the Basilica plan. Also, architect Raymand Charles Péré inspired by Gothic architecture style. The landing, which is on front of the door, is remarkable. Moreover, The cross vaults emphasize the architectural richness that belongs to the roof system.
2 different type of marble are used in interior decoration. One of them is Italian marble (Carrara) that was used on altar located at apse while other was used on columns and the head of these columns located at nave, which is Marmara marble.
There are many sculptors that have significant mean in the church. The most important one is the first religious martyr of the city called St. Polycorpos. There is an org at the upper part of the church that used to pray by women. When plan of church are examined, obviously seen that aisle forms the body of the form while the transept forms the arms of the cross.

Spatial Experience 

The imposing gate and the flowered garden, which is large welcome visitors who approach the church. The wooden gates with the windows create an atrium that blocked the direct entry into the church and keep the general information of the church on the opposite wooden wall.
When visitors enter the church the detail of arches and the ornament columns that has the cross symbol on them attract the attention, which connect the arches each other. Moreover, the colored windows, which are called as stained glass as an architecture term, create an exciting effect on visitors. Also, the high ceiling with the great wooden cross symbol that is above this ceiling and the sculptor of Isa located behind the cross makes the visitors more exciting and feels like they have new and amazing experience.
There is a cabin that is used to confess next to narrow spiral stair while there is a sculpture, which are one of the sculptures in some corner and walls in church. Some sculptures placed all around the church that are unhidden although, some of these sculptures are hidden inside the aisle and sides of the transept to emphasize these sculptures.
Especially , miniature model of the faced made from plaster is attractive which is located on the wall of apse, behind the marble altar. 
The wooden seating areas, which are placed near the extended approach, reflect the importance given to religion by architect and the community at that time. In addition, the type of clearstory windows creates a stir on the visitors emotion while they ware walking towards the altar.

Structure and material qualities 

Columns are the main structural elements of the church. These columns are creating form of the main corridor and it carries the arch roof. Building has got many colons, besides the columns view that architectural element. These columns only complete the roof composition.
It’s possible to see these types of columns behind the altar, which is located at apse. 
The elevation of the church has high quality. Also, it is easy to say that although interior needed restoration, the elevation does not need anything. Especially, the brick and concrete are important considering the age of church.
The only vibrant colors used in the window that are called as stained glass in architecture.

References 

Aziz Helena Kilisesi Yönetimi , Cemaat önderleri

http://mekan360.com/360fx_sthelenkilisesisantaalinakarsiyakaizmir.html

http://www.izmirkulturturizm.gov.tr/TR,90976/saint-helen-katolik-kilisesi.html

Roman Catholic churches in Karşıyaka
Karşıyaka District
Churches completed in 1904
20th-century Roman Catholic church buildings in Turkey